Elisa Frota Pessoa, born Elisa Esther Habbema de Maia (17 January 1921 – 28 December 2018), was a Brazilian experimental physicist. She was one of the first women to graduate in physics in Brazil, in 1942, and a founding member of the Centro Brasileiro de Pesquisas Físicas (Brazilian Center of Physical Research). She was distinguished by her studies of radioactivity with nuclear emulsions; reactions and disintegrations of K and π mesons in nuclear emulsions; and reactions of protons and deuterons with nuclei of average masses.

Early life 
She was born in Rio de Janeiro, daughter of Juvenal Moreira Maia and Elisa Habbema de Maia. She began to become interested in science in 1935, in the ginasial (middle school) at the Escola Paulo de Frontin. Her greatest influence was professor Plinio Süssekind da Rocha with whom she took physics classes. He followed her closely and guided her, giving her subjects outside the program to study. At the end of high school Elisa wanted to study engineering, against the will of the family, since her father, very conservative, considered that the best career for women was the marriage. This, however, did not prevent her from enrolling in the Physics course of the Faculty of Philosophy of the University of Brazil (current Federal University of Rio de Janeiro), graduating in 1942.

Career 
Together with Sonja Ashauer, who graduated the same year at USP, she was the second woman to graduate in physics in Brazil. Soon she excelled in the course and in the second year, was called by professor Joaquim da Costa Ribeiro to be his assistant. She worked with Costa Ribeiro, without receiving a salary, until 1944, when she was hired by the university. At the age of 18, she was married to her former teacher, the biologist Oswaldo Frota-Pessoa, with whom she had two children, Sonia and Roberto. In 1951, she separated of the husband, and started to live with the also physicist Jayme Tiomno.

Along with Tiomno and other graduated physicists at the same time, such as José Leite Lopes, Cesar Lattes, and Mario Schenberg, she promoted science in Brazil, at the same time facing prejudice being a woman and separated from her husband in a time when divorce was illegal in Brazil. In 1949, she was one of the founders of the Brazilian Center for Physical Research (CBPF), where she was Chief of the Nuclear Emulsions Division until 1964.

In 1950, she published with Neusa Margem the first research article of the new institution: "Sobre a desintegração do méson pesado positivo". This work obtained for the first time results that experimentally supported the V-A theory of weak interactions. Her other work, published in 1969, put an end to a long controversy over the possibility of π meson having non-zero spin. She also collaborated with European researchers in the study of K mesons.

Frota Pessoa moved to Brasília in 1965, to work in the University of Brasilia. She then transferred to the University of São Paulo, but she was expelled by the AI-5 in April 1969. Fleeing from the military dictatorship persecution, she worked in Europe and the US, where she collaborated in the training of Brazilian physicists. In 1975, Elisa began setting up an emulsion laboratory at PUC with the assistance of Ernst Hamburger from IFUSP. Two years later, in 1977, as a member of the Experimental Physics Department at IFUSP, she continued her work at PUC in collaboration with IFUSP. In 1980 she resumed her work at CBPF, implanting a nuclear emulsion laboratory for nuclear spectroscopy. Even after compulsory retirement, in 1991, she remained until 1995 as an emeritus professor at the center.

Death 

Elisa died on 28 December 2018, in Rio de Janeiro. She left five grandchildren (a biochemist, an art historian, an economist, an engineering student and a high school graduate) and six other great-grandchildren.

Main works 

1950 – Sobre a desintegração do méson pesado positivo. Anais da Academia Brasileira de Ciências. vol. 22, p. 371 – 383 (with N. Margem)
1955 – A new radioactive method for markings mosquitoes and its application. Proceedings of Geneva Conference on Peaceful Applications of Atomic Energy. p. 140 – (with N. Margem e M.B. Aragão)
1961 – On the observation of fast hyperons emitted from the interactions of K mesons with emulsion nuclei. Il Nuovo Cimento. , Série 10 – with the European Collaboration Group . vol. 19 , p. 1077–1089
1969 – Isotropy in π−μ Decays. Physical Review. 177 (5): 2368–2370. 1983 – States in 118Sn from 117Sn (d,P)118Sn at 12 MeV. Il Nuovo Cimento. vol. 77A, p. 369 – 4011986 – States in 94Zr from 94Zr (d,d')94Zr* at 15.5 MeV. Il Nuovo Cimento. vol. 96A, p. 347 – 365 (with S. Joffily)''

References 

1921 births
2018 deaths
20th-century Brazilian physicists
20th-century Brazilian women scientists
Federal University of Rio de Janeiro alumni
People from Rio de Janeiro (city)